Ywain, also called Owain, Yvain, Ewain or Uwain, is a Knight of the Round Table in the Arthurian legend.

Ywain may also refer to:

 Owain mab Urien, historical figure
 Ywain the Bastard, another Knight of the Round Table
Yvain, the Knight of the Lion, a 12th-century romance by Chrétien de Troyes
Owain, or the Lady of the Fountain, a Welsh adaptation of Chrétien's Yvain
 9501 Ywain, minor planet
 Yvaine, a fictional character in Stardust

See also
 Owain, name